Food Donation Connection (FDC), LLC  is a privately owned American company that serves as the liaison between restaurants/food service companies interested in donating surplus food, and local social service agencies that distribute food to people in need. The company’s vision, “Let Nothing Be Wasted”, is a response to the challenge given by Jesus in the Gospel of John (John 6:1-12).  Jesus, after providing food to feed over 5,000 people, asked his disciples to gather up the food that was left, so that it would not be wasted.  FDC’s objective is to redirect wholesome prepared food to organizations that help the hungry; food that would otherwise be thrown out by food service organizations.

The company was founded in 1992 by Bill Reighard, a former restaurant executive. Its operations and Harvest Support call center are located in Knoxville, Tennessee. FDC assists food service companies by developing and implementing Harvest Food Donation Programs, custom-designed to provide an alternative to discarding surplus prepared food.

While other organizations focus on the collection and distribution of non-perishable foods, FDC provides an alternative to discarding surplus, wholesome prepared food (such as excess, order errors, and food that is past the restaurant’s conservative shelf life date but is still wholesome). As the industry leader in coordinating prepared food donations, FDC coordinates these donations from client donors such as restaurants, college campuses, airports and hospitals to food rescue agencies across the U.S. and Canada, as well as some overseas locations.

FDC supports both donors and agencies using a unique communication and reporting network with a support center, and maintains expertise in operations, food quality and food safety, and tax savings. For its donor partners, FDC sets up and coordinates all aspects of the food donation program, including feasibility testing, development of quality and safe-handling guidelines for processing of donations, linking donor locations to qualified local food rescue organizations, tax valuation and reports for tax purposes, and ongoing program management to ensure proper program implementation.  In 2011, FDC coordinated the donation of 35 million pounds of wholesome, prepared surplus food from 248 food service business entities (with 13,880 restaurants or donor locations) to 7,908 local non-profit hunger relief organizations.

FDC supports its agency partners by analyzing their current needs and linking them to one or more appropriate food service businesses who provide donations of surplus, perishable, prepared food. This prepared food allows the recipient agency to focus its resources on fulfilling its core mission, as opposed to spending resources on purchasing and preparing food.

Food Donation Connection does not compete against non-profits for funding from government and private sources. Instead, FDC funding is derived from a percentage of donor partners' incremental tax savings, that result from the proper donation of surplus food. Donor efforts to properly store and donate surplus food are rewarded by opportunities to become involved in their local communities, build corporate goodwill and employee morale, recognize potential tax savings, and reduce their carbon footprint.

The Harvest Support Network (HSN) was formed as a non-profit organization by FDC, which assisted recipient agencies by providing services that complement the processes in place at these non-profits. HSN ended its legal designation as a 501C3 charity and no longer accepts donations from the public. Instead support for these activities have been absorbed by FDC and others interested in supporting those that serve the hungry. The primary reason for changing its legal designation is that the additional resources required to fund-raise did not warrant the non-profit designation.

HSN’s mission is to provide systems and operational support to 501(c)(3) food banks and other charitable entities to allow these organizations to focus their limited resources on their designated non-profit purposes. HSN provides training materials, scheduling and tracking systems, and tools that enable agencies to better match their needs and volunteer interests. These services further improve the ability of non-profits to achieve their individual missions and operate more efficiently.

Partnerships and Civic Involvement
In 2009, Food Donation Connection established a formal partnership with the National Restaurant Association to raise awareness of alternatives to over-loading landfills with discarded surplus food, and for the purpose of “relieving hunger and reducing food waste in America.”

The company is also involved in efforts to encourage legislation like the Bill Emerson Good Samaritan Act of 1996, which protects good faith donors from civil and criminal liability, as well as donation tax laws that improve incentives for food donors and increase food donations, both large and small.

Donor Partners
As of 2012, FDC actively coordinates Harvest Food Donation Programs for 248 companies, including the following restaurants and food service companies:

ARAMARK
Auntie Anne's
Bob Evans Restaurants
Brinker International
Caribou Coffee
Chipotle Mexican Grill
Darden Restaurants (Olive Garden, LongHorn Steakhouse, The Capital Grille, Bahama Breeze, Seasons 52, Cheddar's Scratch Kitchen)
Famous Dave's
HMSHost
NPC International
Papa John's Pizza
Red Lobster
Starbucks
Yum! Brands (Pizza Hut, KFC, Taco Bell, The Habit Burger Grill)
Wawa
Whole Foods

Harvest Recipient Partners
As of 2012, FDC coordinates the donation of surplus, wholesome prepared food to benefit over 7,900 local agencies. These agencies include such organizations as homeless shelters, teen homes, after-school programs, crisis shelters for women and children, soup kitchens, emergency food pantries, and food rescue organizations.

See also 
 Donation
 Food Bank
 Soup kitchen

References

Organizations established in 1992
Companies based in Knoxville, Tennessee
Hunger relief organizations
1992 establishments in Tennessee